La Federation of Students of the Pontifical Catholic University of Valparaíso (also known by his Spanish acronym FEPUCV) is the official representative body of Pontificia Universidad Católica de Valparaíso students. The institution is headed by a six-member board of directors, who represent more than 16,000 University students. FEPUCV is a CONFECH member. Representatives are elected for a period of one year by direct election.

References

Students' unions
Student organisations based in Chile